Fudbalski klub Mačva Šabac is a Serbian professional football club based in Šabac. The nickname was used for the first time in 1927, when the Uruguay national football team were one of the best teams in the world, and due to local people and media comparing Mačva's style to that of the Uruguayan team, the main daily newspaper Politika consistently used the nickname .

In the period of Yugoslavia, Mačva mostly played in the lower tiers of the football system but did spend two seasons in national top flight of Yugoslavia, it was in seasons 1951 and 1952 Yugoslav First League. Afterwards, they would spend the next six decades in the Yugoslav lower-leagues but were a stable and respected lower tier club in the country.

Mačva has experienced greatest success since Serbia became independent, reaching the top-tier Serbian SuperLiga for the first time ever in the 2017–18 season and reaching the top tier of Yugoslav/Serbian football for the first time in over six decades.

History in Yugoslav league 
The club was founded in 1919. It competed in the 1.Yugoslav football league system until 199eague of the Novi Sad district (a league within the Belgrade Football Subassociation) and in 1930 the league was transferred into the First League of the Novi Sad Football Subassociation. In the period between the two world wars Mačva developed a fierce rivalry for the titles in those leagues with FK Vojvodina. The highlight for Mačva in this era was their participation in the 1930–31 Yugoslav Football Championship, even though they finished at the bottom in 6th place.

During this period the club got nicknamed in the press the "Provincial Uruguay". Provincial because they were playing in the Provincial Group of the Belgrade Subassociation League, and Uruguay because of their playing style which resembled Uruguay's, highly regarded at that time as they were the Olympic champions. The nickname was used for the first time in 1927. By early spring of 1928, Mačva finished at the top of the First League of the Novi Sad District where they defeated their main rivals Vojvodina. In the decisive match Mačva won over Vojvodina by 6:1. By the league system of that time, the winners of the district (župa) leagues had to compete to determine the Belgrade Subassociation Provincial League champion. Mačva first played at home against the winner of Banat district league champion, Obilić Veliki Bečkerek, which they won by 4:1, and then played away and won by 4:3 against the champion of the Šumadija district league, FK Šumadija 1903. Then, the draw determined that the final match would be played in Šabac against ZAŠK from Zemun, which Mačva smashed by 6:1 with goals by Bora Kesić, Milan Perić, Raduška Gajić and Kokan Stevanović. Otto Fischer coached the team in the 1930–31 Yugoslav Championship.

After becoming Belgrade Subassociation Provincial League champions, Mačva became notorious and the main daily newspaper Politika consistently used the nickname Provincial Uruguay, especially after their surprising win against SK Jedinstvo Beograd by 3:2 in Belgrade, and after their successful tour in Greece where they beat Thessaloniki sides Iraklis by 3:1, and Aris by 4:2.

In the following season, they became Novi Sad District League champions for the third time and qualified for the Vojvodina Group of the Belgrade Subassociation League. Mačva won the league and thus earned a spot in the Yugoslav First League where the major clubs in the country compete. They played well against BSK Belgrade and Hajduk Split and won in competition with the three-time Yugoslav champions Građanski Zagreb. Some Mačva players started to receive calls for the Yugoslav national team, namely Milorad Arsenijević, Ivan Bek, Milorad Ilić, Milanče Jovanović, Radomir Vojisavljević, Andreja Kojić, Raduška Gajić and Bora Kesić. Other players of the Provincial Uruguay generation were Jefta Jovanović, Jovan Vračarić, Jovan Cvetković, Gidra Šljivić, Milan Perić, Kokan Stefanović, Kulja Suvajdžić, Bata Kiš, Vido Božović, Moma Jovanović, Mikica Sinđelić, Đole Jovanović, Đorđe Pantazijević, Mikela Stanojčić, Mita Salajdžijević, Nikola Kradžić, and Brana Janković.

After the Second World War, still within Yugoslavia, Mačva played two seasons in national top flight, it was in seasons 1951 and 1952 Yugoslav First League. Afterwards, they spent the next 6 decades in lower-leagues.

Recent history 

Under the club presidency of former Yugoslavia goalkeeper Ivica Kralj,  FK Mačva returned to top flight football, after a six decade absence. in March 2015, Mačva made headlines by becoming the first professional club in Europe to have a Mongolian player, the international Murun Altankhuyag

In the 2017–18 Serbian SuperLiga season, Mačva's first season back in the top flight after more than six decades, Mačva finished in 12th position out of 16 clubs in the Serbian SuperLiga finishing the season with 11 wins 8 draws and 18 losses with a goal difference of 38 against 52. Securing survival in the club's first season back in the top flight after more than six decades of absence from top tier, was an accomplishment of a goal made at the start of the season by the club management. In the 2018–19 Serbian SuperLiga, Mačva finished in 12th place the same position they finished in their first season in the top flight of Serbian Football a considerable success for the club due to been without a major sponsor.

The 2019–20 Serbian SuperLiga season was a disaster for Mačva, they finished bottom of the ladder (16th) winning only two games out of a possible 30, but due to the COVID-19 global pandemic, the Football Association of Serbia decided against relegating the bottom two teams of the Serbian SuperLiga which were FK Mačva and Belgrade club FK Rad, The  Football Association of Serbia decided to scrap relegation and add more clubs so the league in the 2020/21 season would be going ahead with 20 clubs. In a time of crisis for the entire world some fortune came Mačva's way in a time of misery for most. In the 2019/20 season, Mačva struggled for goals all season scoring the least amount of goals in the league with only 18 goals scored all up.

Supporters
The organized supporters of Mačva Šabac are known as Šaneri (Serbian Cyrillic: Шанери), and have a friendship with Napredak Kruševac fan group Jakuza.

Honours
National Championships
 Serbian First League
 Winner (1): 2016–17
 Serbian League West
Winner (2): 2013–14, 2015–16

Current squad

Notable players
Former players with senior national team appearances:

 Đorđe Kamber
 Vladan Tomić
 Ivan Bek
 Nenad Erić
 Filip Despotovski
 Hristijan Kirovski
 Perica Stančeski
 Filip Kasalica
 Murun Altankhuyag
 Dilan Ortiz
 Andrija Kaluđerović
 Nemanja Miletić
 Bojan Šaranov
 Miroslav Đukić
 Bojan Neziri
 Boris Vasković
 Andreja Kojić
 Aleksandar Ivoš
 Vojislav Melić

For the list of all current and former players with Wikipedia article, please see: :Category:FK Mačva Šabac players.

References

External links
 Official site 
 Saneri Šabac 
 Club profile and squad at Srbijafudbal.

 
Football clubs in Serbia
Football clubs in Yugoslavia
Association football clubs established in 1919
1919 establishments in Serbia